Tasta Idrettslag is a Norwegian association football  club from Tasta, Stavanger, Rogaland.

It was established in 1963. The men's football team currently plays in the Fourth Division, the fifth tier of Norwegian football. The team played in the Third Division from 2000 to 2002.

References

 Official site 

Football clubs in Norway
Sport in Stavanger
Association football clubs established in 1963
1963 establishments in Norway